The city of Chicago has been known by many nicknames, but it is most widely recognized as the "Windy City".

The earliest known reference to the "Windy City" was actually to Green Bay in 1856. The first known repeated effort to label Chicago with this nickname is from 1876 and involves Chicago's rivalry with Cincinnati. The popularity of the nickname endures to this day, more than a century after the Cincinnati rivalry ended.

Etymology
There are four main possibilities to explain the city's nickname: the weather, as Chicago is near Lake Michigan; the rivalry with Cincinnati; the World's Fair; and politics.

Weather
While Chicago is widely known as the "Windy City", it is not the windiest city in the United States. Some of the windier cities recorded by the NOAA/NCDC are
Dodge City, Kansas, at 13.9 mph (22.3 km/h);
Amarillo, Texas, at 13.5 mph (21.7 km/h); 
and Lubbock, Texas, at 12.4 mph (20 km/h).
Chicago is not significantly windier than any other U.S. city.

The following "windy city" explanation involving a "wind tunnel" effect is from the Freeborn County Standard of Albert Lea, Minnesota, on November 20, 1892:

An explanation for Chicago being a naturally breezy area is that it is on the shores of Lake Michigan.

Chicago had long billed itself as an ideal summer resort because of its cool lake breeze. The Boston Globe of July 8, 1873, wrote that "a few years ago, Chicago advertised itself as a summer resort, on the strength of the lake breezes which so nicely tempered the mid-summer heats." The Chicago Tribune of June 14, 1876, discussed "Chicago as a Summer Resort" at length, proudly declaring that "the people of this city are enjoying cool breezes, refreshing rains, green fields, a grateful sun, and balmy air—winds from the north and east tempered by the coolness of the lake, and from the south and west, bearing to us frequent hints of the grass, flowers, wheat and corn of the prairies."

The February 4, 1873, Philadelphia Inquirer called Chicago "the great city of winds and fires."

Cincinnati rivalry

Cincinnati and Chicago were rival cities in the 1860s and 1870s. Cincinnati was well known in the meatpacking trade and it was called "Porkopolis" from at least 1843. Starting from the early 1860s, Chicago surpassed Cincinnati in this trade and proudly claimed the very same "Porkopolis" nickname.

The baseball inter-city matches were especially intense. The 1869 Cincinnati Red Stockings were the pride of all of baseball, so Chicago came up with a rival team called the White Stockings to defeat them. "Windy City" often appeared in the Cincinnati sporting news of the 1870s and 1880s.

Four of the first known citations of "Windy City" are from 1876, all involving Cincinnati:

 Chicago Tribune, April 20, 1876, headline: "The WINDY CITY Jay-Rollers La-Crosse Team Wins Inaugural Game against Cincinnati Nannies." 
 The Cincinnati Enquirer, May 9, 1876, headline: "THAT WINDY CITY. Some Freaks of the Last Chicago Tornado."
 The Cincinnati Enquirer, May 13, 1876: "Only the plucky nerve of the eating-house keeper rescued the useful seats from a journey to the Windy City."
 Chicago Tribune, July 2, 1876: "The Cincinnati Enquirer, in common with many other papers, has been waiting with great anxiety for the fulfillment of its prophecy: that the Chicago papers would call the Whites hard names when they lost. Witness these scraps the day after the Whites lost to the Athletics: There comes a wail to us from the Windy City."

World's Fair Myth

It is a popular myth that the first person to use the term "Windy City" was The New York Sun editor Charles Dana, in a New York Sun article in the 1890s complaining about Chicago's victory in 1890 over New York in its bid to host the World's Fair. However, the term was in common use since at least 1886, while the first known use of it was from 1876. As Chicago did not win the bid to host the World's Fair until 1890, Dana cannot possibly have been the source of the term.

Politics
Nineteenth-century journalists frequently referred to Chicago as the windy city because they allegedly believed Chicagoan politicians were nothing but profit-centric. However, it's worth noting that the rivalry was between Chicago, a growing metropolis in the nineteenth century, and other cities such as New York City, from where most of these journalists came. In other words, the Windy City is not a nickname Chicago gave itself, but rather something that the city has embraced over time.

"The Hawk" wind or Hawkins
Chicago's wind is often called "The Hawk". This term has long been popular in African American Vernacular English. The Baltimore Sun's series of columns in 1934 attempted to examine the origin of the phrase, "Hawkins is coming", for a cold, winter wind. The first recorded Chicago citation is in the Chicago Defender, October 20, 1936: "And these cold mornings are on us – in other words 'Hawkins' has got us."

In the 1967 song, "Dead End Street", Chicago native Lou Rawls speaks the following intro:

It is also referenced in the first line of Steve Goodman's song, "A Dying Cub Fan's Last Request", is "By the shores of old Lake Michigan / Where the Hawk Wind blows so cold..."

Other cities
Various other cities have also claimed the nickname "Windy City". They include:
Baku, Azerbaijan, Küləklər şəhəri ("the City of Winds")
Edinburgh, Scotland
Essaouira, Morocco, "Wind City of Africa"
Hsinchu, "Windy City" of Taiwan
Lethbridge, Alberta, Canada
Luleå, Sweden, Den blåsiga staden  ("The Windy City")
Majalengka on Java, Indonesia ("the City of Wind")
Pachuca, Hidalgo in Mexico, La Bella Airosa ('The Beautiful Windy One')
Port Elizabeth, South Africa
Wellington, New Zealand
Zaragoza, Spain, La ciudad del viento ("The Windy City")
Davao, Philippines
Sliven, Bulgaria
Philadelphia, Pennsylvania

Notes

External links

Studies in Slang, VII, 2006, pp. 50–71, Barry Popik, academic investigation of Windy City. See also a letter in USA Today by Popik.
Windy City by Michael Quinion at WorldWideWords.org
Windy City, The Straight Dope. Ongoing updates to the source of the name.
Nathan Bierma, "Windy City: Where did it come from?", Chicago Tribune, Dec. 7, 2004, Tempo section, pp. 1, 5. Reprinted in Studies in Slang, VII, 2006, pp. 72–77.

History of Chicago
Windy City
Windy City